Ivan Radoš (born 21 February 1984) is a Croatian retired football player.

Career
On 7 June 2019 it was confirmed, that Radoš had joined Vasas SC.

Club honours

Diósgyőri VTK
Hungarian League Cup (1): 2013–14

References

External links
 
 Profile at Nogometni-magazin.com
Profile at DVTK.eu
Facebook page

1984 births
Living people
Footballers from Zagreb
Association football goalkeepers
Croatian footballers
NK Zagreb players
NK Samobor players
NK Moslavina players
HAŠK players
NK Croatia Sesvete players
Diósgyőri VTK players
Kapaz PFK players
Vasas SC players
FK Radnički 1923 players
Croatian Football League players
Nemzeti Bajnokság I players
Nemzeti Bajnokság II players
Azerbaijan Premier League players
Serbian SuperLiga players
Croatian expatriate footballers
Expatriate footballers in Hungary
Expatriate footballers in Azerbaijan
Expatriate footballers in Serbia
Croatian expatriate sportspeople in Hungary
Croatian expatriate sportspeople in Azerbaijan
Croatian expatriate sportspeople in Serbia